Jason Ferris (born 6 July 1976) is an Australian former professional rugby league footballer who played in the 1990s and 2000s.

Background
Born in Glen Innes, New South Wales, Ferris played his junior rugby league for the Glen Innes Magpies before being signed by the Canberra Raiders. In 1994, while attending Erindale College, he captained the Australian Schoolboys.

Playing career
In 1993, Ferris represented the New South Wales under-17 side, coming off the bench in a 17–22 loss to Queensland.

In Round 3 of the 1996 ARL season, Ferris made his first grade debut for the Raiders against the Parramatta Eels. In his rookie season, he played 13 games, scoring a try and kicking eight goals.

In 1997, Ferris signed with the North Queensland Cowboys, joining his former Raiders' head coach Tim Sheens at the club. In his first season at the club, he played just seven games. In 1998, he became the club's regular starting , starting 19 games.

In 1999, he joined the Cronulla-Sutherland Sharks, playing 14 games as the club won the minor premiership and made it to the preliminary final, which they lost to the St George Illawarra Dragons. In 2000, he played 12 games, predominantly off the bench. In 2001, he played 27 games, starting the season as the club's starting halfback before moving into the  position. He started at hooker in the Sharks' preliminary final loss to the Newcastle Knights. He finished as the club's top point scorer that season with 121 points.

In 2002, Ferris joined the now-defunct Northern Eagles, playing in the club's last ever game, a 28–68 loss to the Penrith Panthers. In 2003, Ferris he moved to the Manly Warringah Sea Eagles, playing 18 games in his lone season for the club.

In 2004, Ferris he became captain-coach of Collegians in the Illawarra Rugby League competition. He was sounded out by the St George Illawarra Dragons about a return to the NRL during the season but the move did not eventuate.

In 2005, he moved to the Leigh Centurions in the Super League, captaining the side for four games before returning to Australia in March after fracturing his cheekbone.

Statistics

ARL/Super League/NRL

Controversy
In November 2009, Ferris was assaulted by two men at Glen Innes and required corrective facial surgery after the attack. In 2010, Ferris was sentenced to at least 13 months in jail after he was convicted of stealing $7,500 from his former employers, the Criterion Hotel in Gundagai in October 2009. He was also charged with a mid-range drink driving offence and two offences of driving with a disqualified license. On appeal, he had his sentence downgraded.

References

1976 births
Living people
Australian rugby league players
Canberra Raiders players
North Queensland Cowboys players
Cronulla-Sutherland Sharks players
Northern Eagles players
Manly Warringah Sea Eagles players
Leigh Leopards players
Rugby league five-eighths
Rugby league halfbacks
Rugby league players from New South Wales